Octomitus is a genus of Excavata.

It includes the species Octomitus intestinalis.

References

Metamonads
Excavata genera